The 2013–14 season was Torino Football Club's 103rd season of competitive football, 86th season in the top division of Italian football and 69th season in Serie A.

Season overview

Giampiero Ventura was confirmed for another season while Torino spent its summer retreat in Bormio, during which youth products Marco Sordi, Vittorio Parigini and Mattia Aramu were aggregated to the first team.

During the 2013–14 season, the club played its best season in the top flight since 1991–92 Serie A – in which the team placed third, with 43 points – finishing in seventh place thanks to goals from Alessio Cerci and the new signing Ciro Immobile, who became (together with Juventus attacking pair Carlos Tevez and Fernando Llorente) the most prolific strike partnership in Serie A with 35 goals total. Immobile, in particular, finished the season as the Capocannoniere with 22 goals, Torino's first since Francesco Graziani in 1976–77. In Coppa Italia the team was instead eliminated in the third round by Pescara.

At the end of the season, after failing to qualify for a UEFA Europa League placement on the field, Torino was later admitted to the competition after exclusion of Parma, who finished sixth but failed to obtain a UEFA license: Thus, Torino found themselves on the continental stage for the first time since the Intertoto Cup of 2002 and, in terms of major competitions, the Cup Winners' Cup in 1994.

Transfers
Leaving the team after five years was captain Rolando Bianchi, who do not renew his expiring contract, and Mario Santana, who returned to Napoli at the end of his loan.

Even before the official opening of the transfer market, the purchases of goalkeeper Daniele Padelli and midfielder Alexander Farnerud were made official; the co-ownerships of the defenders Matteo Darmian and Kamil Glik and midfielders Migjen Basha, Alessio Cerci and Alen Stevanović were resolved in favour of Torino, while the co-ownership with Udinese for the striker Barreto was renewed for another season. Matteo Rubin became full property of Siena.

The official start of the transfer window was heavily influenced by the proceedings of the 2011–12 Italian football scandal: Barreto and Alessandro Gazzi were suspended for three months and ten days, while Jean-François Gillet was initially sentenced to a three years and seven-month ban, then reduced by the TNAS to 13 months.

The market saw the arrival of defenders Cesare Bovo and Emiliano Moretti from Genoa and midfielders Nicola Bellomo from Bari and Omar El Kaddouri from Napoli. During the pre-season retreat, the purchase of Serbian international defender Nikola Maksimović on loan was made official. Angelo Ogbonna, however, after 11 years at Torino between the youth and the first team, was sold to Juventus, while as partial compensation, Italy under-21 striker Ciro Immobile joined Torino; On 8 July, after mutually terminating his contract with Roma, Matteo Brighi returned to Torino. Three days later, Alen Stevanović was loaned with a buying option to Palermo, in Serie B. On 30 July, a co-ownership deal was completed with Siena for the striker Marcelo Larrondo, who would complement the offensive department. On 8 August, after three seasons, the defender Valerio Di Cesare left Torino to move outright to Brescia.

On 31 August, the last day of the transfer window, left back Giovanni Pasquale was signed on loan from Udinese and Tommaso Berni was signed on a free transfer, to serve as the third goalkeeper.

Summer 2013

In

Out

Winter 2013–14

In

Out

Players

Squad information

Competitions

Serie A

The season will start on 24 August 2013 and conclude on 18 May 2014.

League table

Results summary

Results by round

Matches

Coppa Italia

Statistics

Appearances and goals

|-
! colspan="10" style="background:#dcdcdc; text-align:center"| Goalkeepers

|-
! colspan="10" style="background:#dcdcdc; text-align:center"| Defenders

|-
! colspan="10" style="background:#dcdcdc; text-align:center"| Midfielders

|-
! colspan="10" style="background:#dcdcdc; text-align:center"| Forwards

|-
! colspan="10" style="background:#dcdcdc; text-align:center"| Players transferred out during the season

References

Torino F.C.
Torino F.C. seasons